Country of Particular Concern (CPC) is a designation by the United States Secretary of State (under authority delegated by the President) of a nation guilty of particularly severe violations of religious freedom under the International Religious Freedom Act (IRFA) of 1998 (H.R. 2431) and its amendment of 1999 (Public Law 106-55). The term "particularly severe violations of religious freedom" means systematic, ongoing, egregious violations of religious freedom, including violations such as:

a) Torture or cruel, inhuman, or degrading treatment or punishment; 
b) Prolonged detention without charges; 
c) Causing the disappearance of persons by the abduction or clandestine detention of those persons; or 
d) Other flagrant denials of the right to life, liberty, or the security of persons. Nations so designated are subject to further actions, including economic sanctions, by the United States.

USCIRF suggestion 
Issuing recommendations as to countries it believes should be designated as countries of particular concern for their religious liberty violations is the United States Commission on International Religious Freedom (USCIRF), a separate agency created by IRFA (along with the U.S. Department of State's Office of International Religious Freedom) to monitor the state of religious freedom around the world.  Both entities provide policy recommendations to the president, the secretary of state and US Congress. Its recommendations are not always followed by the Secretary of State.

The USCIRF report  recommended each of the following nations as a CPC:

These countries are considered Tier 2 countries and are on the watchlist:

In addition, the USCIRF designated the following non-state actors as "entities of particular concern" (EPCs):

 The Islamic State of Iraq and Syria (ISIS)
 The Taliban in Afghanistan
 Al-Shabaab in Somalia
 al-Nusra Front
 al-Qa’ida
 al-Qa’ida in the Arabian Peninsula (AQAP)
 Boko Haram
 ISIS-Khorasan

Secretary of State announces list 
In December 2020, the U.S. Department of State designated Burma, China, Eritrea, Iran, Nigeria, North Korea, Pakistan, Russia, Saudi Arabia, Syria, Tajikistan and Turkmenistan as Countries of Particular Concern and Afghanistan, the Central African Republic, Cuba, Egypt, Indonesia, Kazakhstan and Nicaragua as countries on the Watch List.

In November 2022, the U.S. Department of State designated Burma (Myanmar), China, Cuba, Eritrea, Iran, North Korea, Nicaragua, Pakistan, Russia, Saudi Arabia, Tajikistan, and Turkmenistan as Countries of Particular Concern and Algeria, the Central African Republic, Comoros, and Vietnam as countries on the Watch List. Entities of Particular Concern includes Al-Shabaab, Boko Haram, Hayat Tahrir al-Sham, the Houthis, ISIS-Sahel (formerly known as ISIS-Greater Sahara), ISIS-West Africa, Jama'at Nasr al-Islam wal Muslimin, the Taliban, and the Wagner Group based on its actions in the Central African Republic.

References

External links
US State Department Office of International Religious Freedom
CPC page at the USCIRF website

Freedom of religion in the United States